

National leagues

Primera División

Champion: Peñarol (48th title)
Top scorer: Antonio Pacheco (23 goals)
International qualifiers:
Copa Libertadores:
Group Stage: Peñarol and Nacional
Preliminary Round: Liverpool
Copa Sudamericana:
First Stage: River Plate and Defensor Sporting
Second Stage: Peñarol
Widest winning margin: Montevideo Wanderers 7–1 Cerro Largo (April 4, 2010), Atenas 0–6 Nacional (March 14, 2010) and Liverpool 7–1 Tacuarembó (October 22, 2009)
Highest scoring: Danubio 4–5 Tacuarembó (January 24, 2010)
Most wins: Nacional and Peñarol (22)
Fewest wins: Atenas (6)
Most draws: Central Español and River Plate (10)
Fewest draws: Atenas and Danubio (3)
Most losses: Atenas (21)
Fewest losses: Peñarol (4)
Most goals scored: Peñarol (70)
Fewest goals scored: Atenas (25)
Most goals conceded: Atenas (62)
Fewest goals conceded: Nacional (28)
Best goal difference: Nacional (+38)
Worst goal difference: Atenas (-37)
Relegated: Atenas, Cerro Largo and Cerrito
Source: RSSSF

Second Division
Segunda División champion: El Tanque Sisley
Top scorer: Daniel Martínez (10 goals)
Apertura champion: Miramar Misiones
Top scorer:  Jesús Benítez (9 goals)
Clausura champion: Bella Vista
Top scorer: Marcelo Fernández and José Pérez Bach (8 goals)

First promotion play-offs

|}

Second promotion play-offs

Promoted teams
El Tanque Sisley
Bella Vista
Miramar Misiones
Source: RSSSF

Clubs in international competitions

National teams

Senior team
This section covers Uruguay's senior team matches from 1 August 2009 until the end of the 2010 FIFA World Cup, on 11 July 2010.

Friendly matches

World Cup qualifiers

2010 FIFA World Cup

Uruguay U-20

2009 FIFA U-20 World Cup

Uruguay U-17

Friendly matches

Copa Diario La Voz del Interior

2009 FIFA U-17 World Cup

References

External links
 AUF
 FIFA.com
 Diario El Pais
 Tenfiel Digital.com
 Uruguayan Players in the World

 
Seasons in Uruguayan football